College for Creative Studies (CCS) is a private art school in Detroit, Michigan. It enrolls more than 1,400 students and focuses on arts education. The college is also active in offering art education to children through its Community Arts Partnerships program and its Henry Ford Academy: School for Creative Studies.

Academics
The college is authorized by the Michigan Education Department to grant bachelor's and master's degrees, and by the National Association of Schools of Art and Design and the Higher Learning Commission.

The college offers Bachelor of Fine Arts degrees in 13 majors and the Master of Fine Arts (MFA) degree.

Notable faculty
Susan Aaron-Taylor - section chairperson of the Fiber Design Department and Professor of the Crafts Department
 John Carroll

Notable alumni
Jelani Aliyu - automobile designer, General Motors' senior program designer and director general of the Nigerian Automotive Design and Development Council
Kevin Beasley - artist
Harry Bertoia - Italian-born artist, sculptor and modern furniture designer
Bob Boniface - automobile designer, General Motors Director of Design
Doug Chiang - American film designer and artist
Stephen Dinehart – designer
Wendy Froud - doll-artist, sculptor and puppet-maker
Ralph Gilles -  president and CEO of the Street and Racing Technology/Motorsports and Senior Vice President of Design at Chrysler Group LLC of Stellantis
Tyree Guyton - noted artist behind the Heidelberg Project
Rosemary Hornak - American folk artist; art collector; philanthropist; and the sister of founding Photorealist and Hyperrealist artist, Ian Hornak.
 Chris Houghton, co-creator of Big City Greens
 John Krsteski - Chief Designer at Genesis USA
David Lyon - designer, Pocketsquare Design worked for VinFast
Paul Mobley – photographer and owner of Paul Mobley Studio
Jerry Palmer - automobile designer and director for General Motors
Joel Piaskowski – director of design, Ford Motor Company
Renée Radell - artist
Mary Lynn Rajskub- known for playing Chloe O'brian in the Fox action-thriller 24
Patrick Schiavone - vice president, design, North America region for Whirlpool Corporation
Kevin Siembieda - co-founder of Palladium Books
B. K. Taylor - illustrator and writer noted for his Odd Rods trading stickers, illustrations for Sick magazine and National Lampoon, and his writing for Home Improvement

References

External links
Official website

 
College for Creative Studies
Culture of Detroit
Art schools in Michigan
Creative Studies, College for
Educational institutions established in 1906
1906 establishments in Michigan